The Empty Home is a 2012 Kyrgyz drama film directed by Nurbek Egen. The film was selected as the Kyrgyz entry for the Best Foreign Language Oscar at the 85th Academy Awards, but it did not make the final shortlist.

Cast
 Maral Koichukaraeva as Ascel
 Cecile Plage as Virginie
 Atai Omurbekov as Marat
 Asan Amanov as Tynchtyk
 Bolot Tentimyshov as Sultan
 Denis Sukhanov as Arkady
 Kseniya Lavrova-Glinka as Masha
 Françoise Michaud as Virginie's mother
 Maxim Glotov as Igor
 Roman Nesterenko as Victor
 Michele Levieux as Midwife

See also
 List of submissions to the 85th Academy Awards for Best Foreign Language Film
 List of Kyrgyz submissions for the Academy Award for Best Foreign Language Film

References

External links
 

2012 films
2012 drama films
Kyrgyzstani drama films
Kyrgyz-language films